Richard Lorenz may refer to:

Richard Lorenz (bobsleigh) (1901–?), Austrian bobsledder
Richard Lorenz (chemist) (1863–1929), chemist from Vienna
Richard Lorenz (artist) (1858–1915), German artist

See also
Lorenz, surname

Disambiguation pages